Perioral dermatitis, also known as periorificial dermatitis, is a common type of skin rash. Symptoms include multiple small (1–2 mm) bumps and blisters sometimes with background redness and scale, localized to the skin around the mouth and nostrils. Less commonly the eyes and genitalia may be involved. It can be persistent or recurring and resembles particularly rosacea and to some extent acne and allergic dermatitis. The term "dermatitis" is a misnomer because this is not an eczematous process.

The cause is unclear. Topical steroids are associated with the condition and moisturizers and cosmetics may contribute. The underlying mechanism may involve blockage of the skin surface followed by subsequent excessive growth of skin flora. Fluoridated toothpaste and some micro-organisms including Candida may also worsen the condition, but their roles in this condition are unclear. It is considered a disease of the hair follicle with biopsy samples showing microscopic changes around the hair follicle. Diagnosis is based on symptoms.

Treatment is typically by stopping topical steroids, changing cosmetics, and in more severe cases, taking tetracyclines by mouth. Stopping steroids may initially worsen the rash. The condition is estimated to affect 0.5-1% of people a year in the developed world. Up to 90% of those affected are women between the ages of 16 and 45 years, though it also affects children and the elderly, and has an increasing incidence in men.

History  
By 1964, the condition in adults became popularly known as perioral dermatitis, but without clear clinical criteria. In 1970, the condition was recognised in children. That all rashes around the mouth are perioral dermatitis has since been frequently debated. That this condition should be renamed periorificial dermatitis has been proposed. Darrell Wilkinson was a British dermatologist who gave one of the earliest 'definitive' descriptions of 'perioral dermatitis' and noted that the condition was not always associated with the use of fluoridated steroid creams.

Signs and symptoms 
A stinging and burning sensation with rash is often felt and noticed, but itching is less common. Often the rash is steroid responsive, initially improving with application of topical steroid. The redness caused by perioral dermatitis has been associated with variable level of depression and anxiety.

Initially, there may be small pinpoint papules either side of the nostrils. Multiple small (1-2mm) papules and pustules then occur around the mouth, nose and sometimes cheeks. The area of skin directly adjacent to the lips, also called the vermillion border, is spared and looks normal. There may be some mild background redness and occasional scale. These areas of skin are felt to be drier and therefore there is a tendency to moisturise them more frequently. Hence, they do not tolerate drying agents well and the rash can be worsened by them.

Perioral dermatitis is also known by other names including rosacea-like dermatoses, periorofacial dermatitis and periorificial dermatitis.
Unlike rosacea which involves mainly the nose and cheeks, there is no telangiectasia in perioral dermatitis. Rosacea also has a tendency to be present in older people. Acne can be distinguished by the presence of comedones and by its wider distribution on the face and chest. There are no comedones in perioral dermatitis.

Causes 
The cause of perioral dermatitis is unclear. The use of topical steroids and cosmetics have the most important role. Although light exposure has been discounted as a causal factor, some reports of perioral dermatitis have been made by some patients receiving Psoralen and ultraviolet A therapy.

Corticosteroids 
Perioral dermatitis often happens after the use of topical steroids on the face, and is more likely to occur the greater the strength of topical steroid used. Discontinuing the steroids often initially worsens the dermatitis, and dependency on the steroids can occur as people believe the steroids were initially controlling the condition. Inhaled corticosteroids may also trigger perioral dermatitis. Perioral dermatitis has a tendency to occur on the drier parts of the face and can be aggravated by drying agents including topical benzoyl peroxide, tretinoin and lotions with an alcohol base.

Immunosuppressants 
Reports of perioral dermatitis in renal transplant recipients treated with oral corticosteroids and azathioprine have been documented.

Cosmetics 
Cosmetics play an important role as causal factors for perioral dermatitis.  Regular generous applications of moisturising creams cause persistent hydration of the layer causing impairment and occlusion of the barrier function, irritation of the hair follicle, and proliferation of skin flora. Combining this with night cream and foundation significantly increases risk of perioral dermatitis 13-fold.

Micro-organisms 
Topical corticosteroids may lead to increase micro-organism density in the hair follicle. The role of infectious agents such as Candida species, Demodex folliculorum, and fusiform bacteria has not been confirmed.

Other potential causes 
The condition may be potentially worsened by fluoridated toothpaste and inhaled corticosteroids. A high prevalence of atopy has been found in those with perioral dermatitis. The possibility of an association with the wearing of the veil in Arab women has been documented.

Pathophysiology 
The pathophysiology of perioral dermatitis is related to disease of the hair follicle as is now included in the ICD-11 due to be finalised in 2018. Lip licker's dermatitis or perioral irritant contact dermatitis due to lip-licking is considered a separate disease categorised under irritant contact dermatitis due to saliva.

Perioral dermatitis is frequently histologically similar to rosacea with the two conditions overlapping considerably. There is a lymphohistiocytic infiltrate with perifollicular localization and marked granulomatous inflammation. Occasionally, perifollicular abscesses may be present when pustules and papules are the dominant clinical findings.

Diagnosis 
A diagnosis of perioral dermatitis is typically made based on the characteristics of the rash. A skin biopsy is usually not required to make the diagnosis but can be helpful to rule out other skin diseases which may resemble perioral dermatitis. Extended patch testing may be useful to also rule out allergic contact causes.

Other skin diseases that may resemble perioral dermatitis include:
 Rosacea
 Acne vulgaris
 Seborrheic dermatitis
 Allergic contact dermatitis
 Irritant contact dermatitis
 Angular cheilitis

Treatment
Multiple treatment regimes are available and treatment algorithms have been proposed.

Perioral dermatitis will usually resolve within a few months without medication, by limiting the use of irritants, including products with fragrance, cosmetics, benzoyl peroxide, occlusive sunscreens, and various acne products. This is called zero treatment. Topical corticosteroids should be stopped entirely if possible. If the flare proves intolerable, temporary use of a less potent topical corticosteroid can often be helpful.

Medication 
A number of medications, either applied directly to the skin or taken by mouth, may hasten recovery. These include tetracycline, doxycycline, and erythromycin. Erythromycin may be used as a cream. Doxycycline is most often the first antibiotic drug choice, given at a daily dosage of 100 mg for up to a month before considering tapering off or stopping. Sometimes, longer duration of low doses of doxycycline are required.

Metronidazole is less effective, but is available in a gel and can be applied twice daily. If the perioral dermatitis was triggered by a topical steroid then pimecrolimus cream has been suggested as effective in improving symptoms. However, this has also been documented to cause the condition.

Prognosis 
Perioral dermatitis is likely to fully resolve with short courses of antibiotics but if left untreated it can persist for years and take a chronic form.

Improvement with tetracyclines is usually seen after 4 days and significantly so after 2 weeks.

Epidemiology 
Most commonly in women between the ages of 16 and 45 years, perioral dermatitis also occurs equally in all racial and ethnic backgrounds and include children as young as three months and is increasingly reported in men. In children, females are more likely affected. It has an incidence of up to 1% in developed countries.

See also

 Childhood granulomatous periorificial dermatitis
 Seborrhoeic dermatitis
Eczema herpeticum, condition that primarily manifests in childhood

References 

Acneiform eruptions